David Westlund (born February 5, 1995) is a Swedish professional ice hockey defenceman. He is currently playing with Östersunds IK of the Hockeyettan (Div.1). Westlund was selected by the Arizona Coyotes in the 6th round, 163rd overall, at the 2014 NHL Entry Draft.

Westlund made his Swedish Hockey League debut playing with Brynäs IF during the 2013–14 SHL season.

Career statistics

Regular season and playoffs

International

References

External links

1995 births
Living people
Arizona Coyotes draft picks
Brynäs IF players
Karlskrona HK players
Swedish ice hockey defencemen
Timrå IK players
People from Östersund
Sportspeople from Jämtland County